The Lyapunov–Malkin theorem (named for Aleksandr Lyapunov and ) is a mathematical theorem detailing stability of nonlinear systems.

Theorem
In the system of differential equations,

If all eigenvalues of the matrix  have negative real parts, and X(x, y), Y(x, y) vanish when x = 0, then the solution x = 0, y = 0 of this system is stable with respect to (x, y) and asymptotically stable with respect to  x. If a solution (x(t), y(t)) is close enough to the solution x = 0, y = 0, then

Example 
Consider the vector field given by 

In this case, A = -1 and X(0, y) = Y(0, y) = 0 for all y, so this system satisfy the hypothesis of Lyapunov-Malkin theorem. 

The figure below shows a plot of this vector field along with some trajectories that pass near (0,0). As expected by the theorem, it can be seen that trajectories in the neighborhood of (0,0) converges to a point in the form (0,c).

References

Theorems in dynamical systems
Stability theory